Gare de Nonancourt is a railway station in Normandy, France, owned and operated by the SNCF and is served by TER Normandie services. It is situated on the Saint-Cyr to Surdon line, serving the town of Nonancourt, in the Eure department of Normandy.

The station contains a passenger building, which is used as a waiting room for passengers. Tickets are not sold at the station.

The station is equipped with two side platforms and two central tracks. The platform changes are made using a footbridge.

In 2018, the station is served by TER Normandie services between Paris-Montparnasse and Argentan (or Granville).

Parking is available close to the station.

History 
In 2015, the annual traffic is estimated around 25,390 commuters.

References 

Railway stations in Eure
Railway stations in France opened in 1986